Sicanje or bocanje was a widespread custom mostly among Roman Catholic Croat women and girls of the central regions of Bosnia and Herzegovina, as well as the Dalmatia region of Croatia. The phenomenon predates the Slavic migration to the Balkans, and consequently Christianity itself, but it was possible to trace its appearance until the middle of the 20th century.

History

The custom is thought to predate the Slavic migration to the Balkans and even Christianity. In the 1st century BC, the Greek historian Strabo wrote of tattooing among inhabitants of this area, namely Illyrians and Thracians, along with other customs. Vlach women from Greece, Macedonia and Herzegovina also utilized tattoos. Archaeologist Ćiro Truhelka researched these types of tattoos in the late 19th century, becoming one of the first to write about them and to illustrate them. In 1894, a Bosnia-based doctor named Leopold Glück published an article in Vienna titled  (The Tattooing of Skin Among the Catholics of Bosnia and Herzegovina) detailing the tattoos observed among the locals.

Women in some parts of the country tattooed their hands and other visible parts of the body (such as brow, cheeks, wrist, or below the neck) with Christian symbols and stećak ornaments. This can be seen today, not only in Bosnia and Herzegovina, but among ethnic Croats from Bosnia and Herzegovina living abroad. Children (generally girls) were tattooed from as early as the age of six, usually during the period between the feast of Saint Joseph in March to the feast of Saint John the Baptist in June.

Designs
The most common symbols tattooed were the cross, bracelet, fence, and branches or twigs. The cross had numerous variations, with one of the most common ones included small branch-like lines called "" or "" (pine tree). Bracelet-like designs were sometimes tattooed around the women's wrists, either with crosses or a fence-like motif. There were many non-Christian, or pagan symbols used, the most common consisting of circles believed to be connected to the traditional circle ("") dances of the villages. The pagan and Christian symbols were mixed together indiscriminately, with the first originating from nature and family in Illyrian times, and the other with later adapted Christian meaning. The most common areas to tattoo were the arms and hands (including fingers), and on the chest and forehead.

Modern
The custom of tattooing young girls died out after World War II with the establishment of the FPR Yugoslavia, and tattoos done by the traditional method are now only seen on old women. Today, there is a growing trend of modern tattoo artists utilising the traditional designs with contemporary tattooing methods in Croatia and Bosnia and Herzegovina.

In media
In 2013, a documentary titled Sicanje, bocanje, tetoviranje aired on Croatian television channel HRT 3. In 2011, Vice published an article titled The Croatian Tattooed Grandma Cult about the phenomena. Furthermore, Vice Serbia released a story and short film titled Tetovirane bake (Tattooed Grandmas), where they interview various Bosnian Croat women about their tattoos.

See also
Religious perspectives on tattooing

References

External links
 Tradicionalno tetoviranje: Iščezli običaj katolika u Bosni
 Cleveland State University Engaged Scholardship: SICANJE

Bosnia and Herzegovina culture
History of the Croats of Bosnia and Herzegovina
Tattooing and religion
Catholic Church in the Ottoman Empire
Ottoman period in the history of Bosnia and Herzegovina
Religion in Bosnia and Herzegovina during Ottoman period